Evergestis limbata is a species of moth of the family Crambidae first described by Carl Linnaeus in 1767. It is found in Europe.

The wingspan is 20–23 mm. The moth flies from June to August depending on the location.

The larvae feed on Brassicaceae species, such as garlic mustard (Alliaria petiolata) and hedge mustard (Sisymbrium officinale).

References

External links
 Waarneming.nl 
 Lepidoptera of Belgium
 Evergestis limbata at UKmoths

Evergestis
Moths described in 1767
Moths of Europe
Taxa named by Carl Linnaeus